List of rally cars

Early era
 BMW 328
 BMW 700
 Ford Cortina MK1
 Ford Falcon
 Ford Fairlane
 Ford Mustang
 Ford Starliner
 Jaguar MkII
 Jaguar XK120
 Jaguar E-Type
 Lancia Fulvia
 Mini Cooper
 Mini Cooper S
 Mitsubishi Lancer 1600 GSR
 Renault 8 Gordini
 Renault Dauphine
 Škoda MB 1100
 Škoda Octavia TS
 Mercedes-Benz W111
 Renault 4
 Triumph Vitesse
 Triumph TR4
 Porsche 356
 Saab Monte Carlo 850
 Volvo Amazon
 Volvo 140
 Volvo 164
 Volvo PV544
 Volvo P1800
 Alfa Romeo Giulia TI
 Alfa Romeo 2000 GTV
 Alfa Romeo 1750 GTV
 Hillman Imp
 Plymouth Valiant
 Opel Rekord
 Fiat 850 Sport Coupé
 Fiat 2300 S Coupé
 Ford Anglia
 Ford Escort RS1600
 Ford Escort RS2000
 Trabant P 50
 Volkswagen Beetle
 Volkswagen Type 3

Group 2 (1966–1981)

 BMW 2002 Turbo
 BMW 2002Ti
 Dodge Ramcharger
 Dodge Charger Hemi
 FSO Polonez 2000 Rally
 Ford Capri 2300
 Mitsubishi Celeste/Plymouth Arrow
 Opel Commodore
 Porsche 930
 Trabant P 50
 Triumph 2000
 Volvo 142

Group 3
 Lancia Beta Coupe
 Porsche 914/6

Group 4 (1973–1983)
 Lancia Stratos HF
 Chevrolet Monza
 Fiat 131 Abarth
 FSO Polonez 2000 Rally
 Ford Escort RS1600
 Ford Escort RS1800
 Ford Escort RS2000
 Ford Escort BDA
 Ferrari 308 GTB
 DAF 66
 Volkswagen Scirocco
 Volkswagen Golf GTi
 Audi Quattro
 Autobianchi A112 Abarth
 Alfa Romeo Alfetta GTV Turbodelta
 Alfa Romeo Alfasud TI
 Alpine-Renault A110
 Alpine-Renault A310
 Audi 50 GL
 Talbot Sunbeam Lotus
 Saab 96 V4
 Saab 99 EMS
 Renault 4 GTL
 Renault 17
 SEAT 124-1800
 Citroën DS21
 Citroën DS23
 Datsun 240Z
 Datsun 1800 SSS
 Datsun Stanza
 Peugeot 104
 Peugeot 504
 Fiat Abarth 124
 Fiat Abarth 124 Rallye
 Fiat 127 Sport
 Mazda 1300
 Mazda RX-3
 Simca Rallye 2
 Simca Rallye 3
 Wartburg 353
 Polski Fiat 125p
 Skoda 120 LS
 Toyota Celica 2000GT RA40 & RA63
 Triumph TR7
 Trabant 601
 Sunbeam Avenger 1600 GT
 Datsun 100A
 Volvo 142
 Porsche 911
 Porsche 934 Turbo
 Mercedes-Benz 450 SL
 Mitsubishi Lancer 2000 Turbo
 Opel Ascona 400
 Opel Kadett Rallye
 Opel Kadett GT/E
 Trabant P 50
 Volvo 240

Group B (1982–1986)

 Alfa Romeo Alfasud Sprint 6C
 Audi Quattro A1
 Audi Quattro A2
 Audi Sport Quattro S1
 Audi Sport Quattro S1 E2
 BMW M1
 Citroën BX 4TC EVO
 Citroën Visa Chrono II
 Citroën Visa Mille Pistes
 Citroën Visa Trophée
 Daihatsu Charade 926 Turbo
 Daihatsu Charade DeTomaso 926R
 Ferrari 288 GTO
 Ferrari 288 GTO Evoluzione
 Ferrari 308 GTB Michelotto
 Ford Escort RS 1700T
 Ford RS200 E
 Ford RS200 E2
 FSO Polonez 2000
 Honda Ballade Sports car
 Lada Samara EVA
 Lada VFTS
 Lancia 037
 Lancia Delta S4
 Mazda RX-7 FB
 Mercedes 190E Cosworth
 MG Metro 6R4
 Moskvich 2141-KR
 Nissan 240RS
 Opel Kadett 4S
 Opel Manta 400
 Opel Manta 400 4WD
 Peugeot 205 Turbo 16
 Peugeot 205 Turbo 16 Evo 2
 Peugeot 305 V6
 Peugeot 504 Pickup
 Porsche 911 Carrera
 Porsche 911 SC RS
 Porsche 911 Turbo RS
 Porsche 924 Turbo Carrera GT
 Porsche 928S
 Porsche 959
 Renault 5 Turbo
 Renault R5 Maxi Turbo
 Renault Alpine A310 V6
 Škoda 130 LR
 Subaru XT 4WD Turbo
 Subaru Leone RX Turbo
 Talbot Horizon
 Talbot Samba Rallye
 Talbot Sunbeam Lotus
 Toyota Celica Twin-Cam Turbo TA64
 Toyota 222D
 Volkswagen Golf GTI

Group S (Cancelled)

 Audi Sport Quattro RS 002
 Ford RS200
 Lada Samara S-proto
 Lancia ECV
 Lancia ECV II
 Toyota 222D
 Opel Kadett Rallye 4x4
 Vauxhall Astra 4S
 SEAT Ibiza Bimotor

Group A (1982–Current)

 Alfa Romeo GTV6
 Alfa Romeo 75 Turbo
 Alfa Romeo 145
 Audi 200
 Audi 80 Quattro
 Audi 90 Quattro
 Type 85 Audi Coupe Quattro
 Audi Coupé S2
 Audi A3
 Audi A4 Quattro
 BMW 318 Ti Compact
 BMW 325i E36
 BMW E30 M3
 BMW E36 M3
 BMW M3 E46
 Citroën AX GT
 Citroën ZX 16v
 Dodge Neon
 Dodge Omni
 Dacia 1310
 Eagle Talon
 Ford Escort XR3i
 Ford Sierra Sapphire Cosworth
 Fiat Panda 45
 Fiat Uno Turbo
 Fiat Ritmo Abarth 130 TC
 FSO Polonez 1600
 FSO 1600 "Bartoś" (rebranded Polski Fiat 125p) 
 Honda Integra Type-R
 Hyundai Tiburon
 Hyundai Elantra
 Volkswagen Gol
 Volkswagen Golf GTI 16V
 Volkswagen Golf Rallye G60
 Volkswagen Senda
 Lada Samara 1300
 Lada Riva
 Lancia Delta HF 4WD
 Lancia Delta Integrale
 Lancia Delta Integrale 16V
 Lancia Delta HF Integrale
 Nissan March Super Turbo
 Toyota Celica GT-Four ST165
 Toyota Celica GT-Four ST185 / Celica Turbo 4WD 
 Toyota Celica GT-Four ST205
 Toyota Corolla GT
 Toyota MR-2
 Toyota Starlet
 Toyota Supra Turbo A
 Toyota Supra 3.0i
 Mazda 323 4WD
 Mazda 323 GT-X
 Mitsubishi Eclipse
 Mitsubishi Starion Turbo
 Mitsubishi Lancer Evolution I
 Mitsubishi Lancer Evolution II
 Mitsubishi Lancer Evolution III
 Mitsubishi Lancer Evolution IV 
 Mitsubishi Lancer Evolution V
 Mitsubishi Lancer Evolution VI
 Mitsubishi Lancer Evolution 6.5
 Mitsubishi Lancer EX2000 Turbo
 Mitsubishi Lancer RS
 Mitsubishi Galant VR-4
 Mitsubishi Carisma GT Evo V
 Mitsubishi Carisma GT Evo VI
 Mitsubishi Carisma GT Evo IV
 Nissan 200SX
 Nissan Sunny GTi-R
 Nissan Micra Kit car NME
 Nissan Pulsar GTI-R NME
 Saab 900 Turbo
 Saab 9-3 Kit Car
 SEAT Ibiza 1.8 16v
 SEAT Ibiza Kit Car
 Skoda Favorit
 Skoda Felicia
 Subaru RX Turbo
 Subaru Vivio Sedan 4WD
 Subaru Impreza 555
 Subaru Impreza WRX
 Subaru Leone
 Subaru Legacy RS
 Subaru Impreza GC
 Ford Escort RS Cosworth
 Ford Sierra RS Cosworth 4x4
 Ford Sierra XR 4x4
 Hyundai Accent LC
 Renault Clio Sport
 Renault Clio Williams
 Renault 11 Turbo
 Renault 5 GT Turbo
 Renault 5 Alpine
 Renault Clio 16S
 Renault Mégane
 Opel Kadett GSi
 Opel Kadett GSi 16V
 Opel Calibra 16V
 Opel Calibra Turbo 4x4
 Peugeot 106
 Peugeot 205 GTI
 Peugeot 306 S16
 Peugeot 309 GTi
 Vauxhall Astra GTE
 Vauxhall Nova GTE
 Opel Omega 3000 12v
 Fiat Seicento Kit Car
 Citroën Xsara Kit Car
 Volvo 343
 Volvo 740
 Volvo 940
 Honda CRX

Group N (1982–Current)
 Subaru Impreza WRX STI
 Nissan Pulsar GTI-R
 Nissan Sentra SE-R
 Proton PERT
 Proton Satria Neo
 Dacia Sandero
 Fiat Stilo Abarth
 FSO Polonez 1600
 Ford Fiesta ST
 Ford Focus Cosworth
 Ford Escort RS Cosworth
 Ford Sierra RS Cosworth
 Lancia Delta HF Integrale
 Mazda 323 4WD
 Mazda 323 GT-X
 Mazda 323 GTR
 Renault 5 GT Turbo
 Mitsubishi Colt Evolution
 Mitsubishi Lancer Evolution I
 Mitsubishi Lancer Evolution II
 Mitsubishi Lancer Evolution III
 Mitsubishi Lancer Evolution IV 
 Mitsubishi Lancer Evolution V
 Mitsubishi Lancer Evolution VI
 Mitsubishi Lancer Evolution VII
 Mitsubishi Lancer Evolution VIII
 Mitsubishi Lancer Evolution IX
 Mitsubishi Lancer Evolution X
 Honda Civic 1.8
 Honda Civic Type R
 Toyota Celica GT-Four ST205
 Skoda Octavia RS
 Volkswagen Polo N1

World Rally Car (1997–2021)

Rally1 (2022–present)

Super 1600 (2001–Current)
 Citroën C2 S1600
 Suzuki Swift S1600
  MG ZR S1600
 Suzuki Ignis S1600
 Alfa Romeo 147 S1600
 Renault Clio S1600
 Suzuki Ignis S1600
 Citroën Saxo VTS S1600
 Volkswagen Polo S1600
 Volkswagen Scirocco S1600
 Toyota Corolla S1600
 Honda Civic S1600
 Hyundai Getz S1600
 Fiat Palio Abarth S1600
 Fiat Punto S1600
 Ford Puma S1600
 Ford Fiesta S1600
 Opel Adam Cup
 Opel Corsa S1600
 Opel Astra S1600
 Peugeot 106 S16
 Peugeot 206 S1600
 Peugeot 206 XS
 Peugeot 208 Maxi

Super 2000 (2010–Current)
 Fiat Grande Punto Abarth S2000
 Fiat Stilo Abarth S2000
 Hyundai i20 WRC
 Alfa Romeo 147
 Ford Fiesta S2000
 Peugeot 207 S2000
 Lada 112 VK S2000
 Škoda Fabia S2000
 Toyota Corolla S2000/RunX
 Toyota Corolla TRD S2000
 Toyota Auris S2000
 Toyota Yaris S2000
 Volkswagen Polo S2000
 MG ZR S2000
 Honda Civic S2000
 Opel Corsa S2000
 Proton Satria Neo S2000
 Fiat Grande Punto S2000
 Mini John Cooper Works S2000
 Mini Cooper S2000 1.6T
 Suzuki Swift Maxi S2000
 Mitsubishi Mirage S2000
 Dacia Logan S2000 (Never entered competition)

RGT (2012–current)
 Lamborghini Gallardo
 Lotus Exige R-GT
 Aston Martin V8 Vantage
 Porsche 996 GT3
 Porsche 997 GT3
 Porsche Cayman S
 Porsche Cayman RGT
 Porsche 718 Cayman GT4 Clubsport
 Fiat Abarth 124 RGT
 Nissan 350Z
 Audi TT
 BMW 135i
 BMW Z3 M
 Porsche 911 GT3

Group Race (2012–current)
 Peugeot 207 MR
 Peugeot 207 RC R3T
 Peugeot 208 MR
 Peugeot 208 R2
 Peugeot 208 R5
 Peugeot 208 T16
 Holden Barina AP4
 Lada Kalina R4
 Fiat Palio MR
 Dacia Sandero R4
 Ford Fiesta MK6.5 R2
 Ford Fiesta MR
 Ford Fiesta R1
 Ford Fiesta R2
 Ford Fiesta R2T
 Ford Fiesta R2T19
 Ford Fiesta MK8 R2T
 Ford Fiesta R2T National
 Ford Fiesta R200
 Ford Fiesta R5
 Ford Fiesta R5+
 Ford Fiesta R5 Evo2
 Ford Fiesta MK8 R5
 Ford Fiesta RRC
 Škoda Fabia RS
 Škoda Fabia R2
 Škoda Fabia R5
 Škoda Fabia R5 Evo
 Hommell Herlinette RS 2
 Nissan Micra R1
 Nissan Micra R2
 Nissan Micra R4
 Mini John Cooper Works RRC
 Mini Cooper JCW R1T
 Mini Cooper S R4
 Mitsubishi Lancer Evo IX R4
 Mitsubishi Lancer Evo X R4
 Mitsubishi Colt R5
 Mitsubishi Mirage R5
 Chevrolet Agile MR
 Chevrolet Sonic RS
 Citroën C2 R2
 Citroën C2 R2 Max
 Citroën C3 R5
 Citroën DS3 MR
 Citroën DS3 R1
 Citroën DS3 R3
 Citroën DS3 R3 Max
 Citroën DS3 R3T
 Citroën DS3 R3T Max
 Citroën DS3 R5
 Citroën DS3 RRC
 DR 1 R1
 Hyundai i20 R5
 Hyundai i20 AP4
 Hyundai i30 Turbo
 Audi A1 R4
 Audi S1 AP4
 Opel Adam R2
 Opel Corsa R5
 Honda Fit R2
 Honda Civic Type-R R3
 Honda Civic R3C
 Proton Iriz R5
 Dacia Logan R3
 Dacia Sandero R3
 Dacia Sandero R4
 Seat Leon Cupra R
 BMW 125i Coupé R3
 Proton Iriz R5
 Renault Clio R3
 Renault Clio R3C
 Renault Clio R3T
 Renault Clio R3 Maxi
 Renault Clio R3 Maxi Evo
 Renault Clio RS
 Renault Clio RS R3T
 Renault Clio Ragnotti
 Renault Mégane RS
 Renault Twingo RS R1
 Renault Twingo III R1
 Renault Twingo R2
 Renault Twingo RS R2
 Renault Twingo RS Evo R2
 Fiat 500 Abarth R3T
 Fiat 500X R4
 Fiat Punto R3
 Fiat Grande Punto R3D
 Mazda 2 AP4
 Mazda RX-8 R3
 Daihatsu Mira R4
 Subaru Impreza STi R4
 Suzuki Baleno R1
 Suzuki Baleno SR R1
 Suzuki Swift R1
 Suzuki Swift R1B
 Suzuki Swift R2
 Suzuki Swift R+
 Toyota Etios R4
 Toyota Etios R5
 Toyota GT86 CS-R3
 Toyota GT86 R3C
 Toyota Run-X RSi
 Toyota Starlet
 Toyota Vitz R1
 Toyota Vitz R1B
 Toyota Yaris R1
 Toyota Yaris R4
 Toyota Yaris R5
 Vauxhall Adam R2
 Volkswagen Gol Trend MR
 Volkswagen Polo R2
 Volkswagen Polo GTI R5
 Volkswagen Polo RN4

References